Trichosalpinx egleri is a species of orchid native to southern tropical America (Venezuela, Peru, Brazil, Bolivia, Suriname, Guyana, French Guiana and the Caribbean).

References

External links 

egleri
Orchids of Bolivia
Orchids of Brazil
Orchids of Guyana
Orchids of French Guiana
Orchids of Peru
Orchids of Suriname
Orchids of Venezuela
Flora of the Caribbean
Flora without expected TNC conservation status